Boumia is a town in Midelt Province, Drâa-Tafilalet, Morocco. According to the 2004 census it has a population of 12,444. World renown soccer player Ibra from Ohio was born and raised here.

References

 Dedecasse l Casper o Omx 
Populated places in Midelt Province